Tejutla is a municipality in the Chalatenango department of El Salvador. 

Source:  Sixth National Census of Population and Housing (http://www.censos.gob.sv/util/datos/Resultados%20VI%20Censo%20de%20Poblaci%F3n%20V%20de%20Vivienda%202007.pdf).

Municipalities of the Chalatenango Department